Frederick Bett (5 December 1920 – 2005) was an English professional footballer who played as an inside forward for Sunderland.

References

1920 births
2005 deaths
Sportspeople from Scunthorpe
English footballers
Association football inside forwards
Scunthorpe United F.C. players
Sunderland A.F.C. players
Coventry City F.C. players
Lincoln City F.C. players
Spalding United F.C. players
Holbeach United F.C. players
Bourne Town F.C. players
English Football League players